"Fantastic Voyage" is a song by American rapper Coolio, released in March 1994 as the third single from his debut album, It Takes a Thief (1994). It was later featured on the compilation album Fantastic Voyage: The Greatest Hits and heavily samples "Fantastic Voyage" by Lakeside. The song peaked at number 12 on the US Billboard Hot R&B/Hip-Hop Singles & Tracks chart, two on the Billboard Hot Rap Singles chart and number three on the Billboard Hot 100. It sold one million copies domestically and received a platinum certification from the Recording Industry Association of America (RIAA).

Content
According to AllMusic's Jason Lymangrover, "With its infectious 'Slide, slide, slippity slide' chorus, it went unnoticed that his breakthrough single, 'Fantastic Voyage,' was actually a song about escapism."

Here, as in the artist’s “Gangster's Paradise," Coolio laments the realities of urban black poverty. He writes "Tryin' to find a place... where my kids can play outside without livin' in fear of a drive by."

Critical reception
Dr. Bayyan from Cash Box commented, "Phat, thumpin’ bass, funky groove and Coolio’s voice tellin’ the story of gangin’, slingin’ and killin’. This song makes successful use of the old Lakeside hit of the same name. Unlike many artists, Coolio hasn’t jumped on the jazz tip. He’s just as funky as can be, especially on the Timber Mix and the QDIII Mix." Charles Aaron from Spin ranked "Fantastic Voyage" number three in his list of the "Top 20 Singles of the Year", writing, "Sociohistorical groove and hair. This man obviously should have his own television show."

Music video
The accompanying music video for the song features Coolio napping on his front porch, when he gets a phone call from his friend Spoon that wakes him. Spoon asks about taking a trip to the beach, to which an annoyed Coolio responds "we ain't got no car" and hangs up on him. Suddenly a mysterious magician man with a '70s style suit, afro, and cane appears and turns the blue bicycle sitting upside down on Coolio's driveway into a blue 1965 Chevrolet Impala convertible car with hydraulics. Now with a means of transportation, Coolio and his crew head to the beach, while picking up people along the way by letting them ride inside the car's trunk. 

The rest of the video features Coolio at the beach helping the crowd of passengers out of the trunk of the car for a beach party, which includes people of all races and a mariachi band. B-Real of Cypress Hill has a cameo. At the end of the video, the car is transformed back into a bicycle on Coolio's driveway and Coolio is woken up again by a phone call from Spoon, showing that the trip was all just a dream. Coolio reminds him that they have no car, telling him to quit calling, and hangs up. Then Coolio looks at the bike to see the dream car's blue custom California license plate saying "FNTX VYG", based on the song's name, is hanging off the bike's front wheel hub. This leaves him wondering if the events were really a dream and dresses the stage for the video "I Remember."

Cast and credits
 Coolio and guest stars
 Directed by: F. Gary Gray
 Cinematographer: Daniel Pearl
 Produced by: Craig Fanning
 Production Manager: Tina Lucarelli and Jack Sawyers
 First assistant director: Greg Webb
 Production coordinators: Frank Bruno, Tina Lucarelli
 Premiere: May 1994, 10:00 a.m.

Charts

Weekly charts

Year-end charts

Certifications

Release history

In popular culture
 The song was used in the Everybody Loves Raymond season 3 episode "Robert's Date."
 In 2018, Chrysler released a music video featuring Coolio called "Vantastic Voyage" to promote the Chrysler Pacifica minivan.
 In 2022, the song was featured in a commercial for Airbnb promoting their Amazing Pools category.

References

1994 songs
1994 singles
Coolio songs
Music videos directed by F. Gary Gray
Songs written by Coolio
Tommy Boy Records singles